Events in the year 1954 in Turkey.

Parliament
 9th Parliament of Turkey (up to 14 May)
 10th Parliament of Turkey

Incumbents
President – Celal Bayar
Prime Minister – Adnan Menderes
Leader of the opposition – İsmet İnönü

Ruling party and the main opposition
  Ruling party – Democrat Party (DP) 
  Main opposition – Republican People's Party (CHP)

Cabinet
20th government of Turkey (up to 17 May)
21st government of Turkey (from 17 May)

Establishments
Refik Restaurant is established by Refik Arslan.

Events
 27 January – Village Institutes were closed
27 January – Nation Party (MP) was closed
25 April – Mersin Harbor groundbreaking
2 may – General election, winner takes all system  (DP 404, CHP 30, CMP 5 and Independents 7) 
30 May – Kırşehir Province which voted for Republican Nation Party (CMP) was abolished by the government
14 June – Sakarya and Adıyaman Provinces were founded
20 July – Nevşehir Province was founded
26 November – Fire in the historical Grand Bazaar in Istanbul

Births
26 February – Recep Tayyip Erdoğan, president
17 may – Belkis Akkale, singer
19 May – Nükhet Duru, singer
5 June – Haluk Bilginer, actor
21 June – Nur Sürer, actress
12 September – Zeynep Değirmencioğlu, actress
13 September – Serra Yılmaz, actress
17 September – Gülsin Onay, concert pianist
5 December – Gülşen Bubikoğlu, actress
31 December – Muhsin Yazıcıoğlu, leader of the Great Union Party

Deaths
11 May – Sait Faik Abasıyanık, writer
23 March – Nakiye Elgün, one of the first female MPs in 1935
23 June – Salih Omurtak, former chief of staff
4 September – Ahmet Zeki Soydemir, retired general

Gallery

References

 
Years of the 20th century in Turkey
Turkey
Turkey
Turkey